Olga Šilhánová (21 December 1920 in Vysoké nad Jizerou – 27 August 1986 in Prague) was a Czech gymnast who competed in the 1948 Summer Olympics, winning gold in the team event.

References

1920 births
1986 deaths
Czech female artistic gymnasts
Olympic gymnasts of Czechoslovakia
Gymnasts at the 1948 Summer Olympics
Olympic gold medalists for Czechoslovakia
Olympic medalists in gymnastics
Medalists at the 1948 Summer Olympics
People from Semily District
Sportspeople from the Liberec Region